Heteroponera carinifrons is a species of ant in the genus Heteroponera, endemic to Chile. It was described by Mayr in 1887.

References

Heteroponerinae
Hymenoptera of South America
Insects described in 1887
Endemic fauna of Chile